The University of South Africa (UNISA), known colloquially as Unisa, is the largest university system in South Africa by enrollment. It attracts a third of all higher education students in South Africa. Through various colleges and affiliates, UNISA has over 400,000 students, including international students from 130 countries worldwide, making it one of the world's mega universities and the only such university in Africa.

As a comprehensive university, Unisa offers both vocational and academic programmes, many of which have received international accreditation, as well as an extensive geographical footprint, giving their students recognition and employability in many countries the world over. The university lists many notable South Africans among its alumni, including two Nobel prize winners: Nelson Mandela, the first democratically elected president of South Africa and Archbishop Desmond Tutu.

Founded in 1873 as the University of the Cape of Good Hope, the University of South Africa (or Unisa as it is commonly known) spent most of its early history as an examining agency for Oxford and Cambridge universities and as an incubator from which most other universities in South Africa are descended. Legislation in 1916 established the autonomous University of South Africa (the same legislation established Stellenbosch University and the University of Cape Town as autonomous universities) as an "umbrella" or federal institution with its seat in Pretoria, playing an academic trusteeship role for several colleges that eventually became autonomous universities. The colleges that were under UNISA's trusteeship were Grey University College (Bloemfontein), Huguenot University College (Wellington), Natal University College (Pietermaritzburg), Rhodes University College (Grahamstown), Transvaal University College (Pretoria), the South African School of Mines and Technology (Johannesburg), and Potchefstroom University College. In 1959, with the passage of the Extension of University Education Act, UNISA's trusteeship also extended to the five "black universities", namely University of Zululand, University of the Western Cape, University of the North, University of Durban-Westville, and University of Fort Hare. In 1946, UNISA was given a new role as a distance education university, and today it offers certificate, diploma and degree courses up to doctoral level.

In January 2004, Unisa merged with Technikon Southern Africa (Technikon SA, a polytechnic) and incorporated the distance education component of Vista University (VUDEC). The combined institution retained the name University of South Africa. It is now organised by college and by school; see below.

The university

Location 
Unisa's Muckleneuk Campus is located in Pretoria and is a major landmark of the capital city. It was in 1972 that Unisa moved into its new home on Muckleneuk Ridge having vacated the old quarters in central Pretoria. The complex of buildings was designed by Bryan Sandrock Architects in the 1960s and expresses an international style characterised by monumental proportions and engineering feats like the cantilevered structures. The most striking feature is the long projection from the brow of the hill, supported by a giant steel girder resting on a massive column.

Also in Pretoria is the Sunnyside campus, the main area of student activity. The Florida campus in Johannesburg is Unisa's science campus. The College of Agriculture and Environmental Sciences and some departments of the College of Science, Engineering and Technology is housed here. The science campus contains 12 buildings, a library, two auditoriums and a large study area. It also includes a horticultural centre and a multipurpose research and training facility designed to meet the education and research needs of students in a range of programmes including agriculture, ornamental horticulture and nature conservation.

The university has seven regional centres in South Africa, servicing students in all nine provinces. These are:

 Eastern Cape (East London, Mthatha, Port Elizabeth)
 Gauteng (Ekurhuleni, Florida, Johannesburg, Pretoria, Vaal Triangle)
 Kwazulu-Natal (Durban, Newcastle, Pietermaritzburg, Richards Bay, Wild Coast Region)
 Limpopo Province (Giyani, Makhado, Polokwane)
 Midlands (Bloemfontein, Kimberley Kroonstad, Mafikeng, Potchefstroom, Rustenburg)
 Mpumalanga (Middelburg, Nelspruit)
 Western Cape (Cape Town, George)

Students and staff 

According to data extracted from the final audited Higher Education Management Information System (HEMIS) submissions to the Department of Higher Education and Training (DHET), Unisa had 355,240 students enrolled in 2013 from South Africa, Africa, and other international states. The largest portion of these students are South African, being 91.4% (324,607) of the sum of the student enrollments. The College of Economic and Management Sciences (CEMS) is the largest of the eight colleges, with 26.7% (94,972) of the total student enrollments.

According to the same HEMIS submission, Unisa had 5,575 staff members in 2013. The staff complement consisted of 3,261 females (55.7%) and 2,593 (44.3%) males. 2011 figures from the Department of Institutional Statistics and Analysis (DISA) at the university show that the majority of the staff employed are non-professional administrative staff, being 56.8% (3,164). The number of institutional/research professionals are 33.2% (1,846) of the sum of the staff employed.Therefore, it is imperative for editors to note unverified notes here,<now everyone is editing>

Academic community 

As one of the world's mega universities, Unisa presents academic offerings associated with both technological and traditional universities. These include, but are not limited to, a combination of career-orientated courses usually associated with a university of technology, and formative academic programmes typically linked to a traditional university.

 College of Accounting Sciences
 College of Agricultural and Environmental Sciences
 College of Education
 College of Economic and Management Sciences
 College of Graduate Studies
 College of Human Sciences
 College of Law
 College of Science, Engineering and Technology
 Graduate School of Business Leadership (SBL)

In addition to the eight colleges and SBL, Unisa has numerous bureaus, centres, institutes, museums and units supporting academic development and research.

Despite the qualifications offered by the various departments, the College of Science, Engineering and Technology offers sub-standard qualifications, being on Dublin (Technician) & Sydney (Technologist) Accords. Simply put a graduate from the university cannot register as a Professional Engineer. Recently the university has introduced the new Bachelor of Engineering Technology Honours being a Level 8 qualification and still not recognised on Professional Engineer level.

Ranking 

In 2015, the University of South Africa was ranked the 6th best university in South Africa by the Times Higher Education. This makes the university the 6th best university in Africa, out of 30.

Distance education at Unisa

Accreditation 

Unisa received a royal charter in 1877. It currently operates under the Statute of the University of South Africa issued in terms of the Higher Education Act (No. 101 of 1997), and is accredited by the South African Department of Education and the Council on Higher Education (CHE). Its qualifications (including those of the SBL) are registered with the South African Qualifications Authority (SAQA).

International accreditation of Unisa's qualifications 

Unisa is inter alia listed in the following publications: International Handbook of Universities published by the United Nations Education, Scientific and Cultural Organization (UNESCO) and officially verified by the International Association of Universities.

In other cases the publication of an institution's name in specific authoritative publications forms the basis of accreditation. Students must however enquire from the specific foreign country/university whether Unisa's qualifications are accredited/recognised.

Internationally, Unisa is listed in the Commonwealth Universities Handbook of 1999 and also in the International Handbook of Universities of 1998. It is actually listed as Member of the Association of Commonwealth Universities (ACU 2018).

The qualifications offered by the College of Science, Engineering and Technology are also accredited internationally through the accreditation done by the Engineering Council of South Africa under the Dublin and Sydney Accords.

Entrance requirements 

Students need a school-leaving qualification that would entitle them to enter a university or college in their own country. The majority of applications are now processed online., you will need to meet the requirements for the course you are looking to study.

The university has introduced new rules on entrance requirements since 2014, this outright rejects TVET College graduates. Previously these students was allowed to complete bridge subjects and even Higher Certificates before going towards the Diploma and National Diploma. Even completing the National Senior Certificate (Vocational) Level 4 will not be accepted without further education. Universities South Africa argue the subjects from the school curriculum are more "significant in-depth" than the N3 subjects. The university is therefore likely the only university with this rule. Universities South Africa refers these students to consider other universities and colleges.

Academic dress 

 Bachelors, masters and honours degrees: black gown with the same pattern as a Master of Arts gown of the University of Oxford or Cambridge, and a black cap with a black tassel.
 Doctoral degrees: cardinal red gown with open sleeves lined in cardinal red, cardinal red cap with a tassel in the colour of the college concerned.

Culture 

Unisa has been promoting and promulgating culture in all its manifestations since its inception in 1873. Apart from the academic courses offered by Unisa's College of Humanities, practical language, art and music skills have been actively pursued through the setting of curricula and the implementation of special courses and examinations.

 African Centre for Arts, Culture and Heritage studies
 Museum of Anthropology and Archaeology
 Department of Music
 Unisa Space Art Gallery
 Unisa Music Foundation

Unisa Foundation 

The Unisa Foundation was established in 1966 and now has approximately 280 active donors, many of them individual alumni with the desire to give back to the communities, South African and international, with a sense of social responsibility. Equally vital is the role played by the Board of Trustees, whose members not only oversee the affairs of the Unisa Foundation but who also lend the weight of their professional and personal reputations in a drive to reach potential donors, without financial reward to themselves.

Based at Unisa's main campus in Muckleneuck, Pretoria, the foundation has Fundraising and Development Divisions in Gauteng, the Western Cape and Kwa-Zulu Natal. These divisions support the smooth running of projects being undertaken in their regions while raising additional funding for local community projects.

Unisa Press 

Unisa Press is the largest university press in South Africa, with the biggest publication list.

University leaders, notable alumni, and faculty 
See the main article, List of University of South Africa people.

Corruption controversy 
On 17 October 2021, a leaked ministerial report claimed that rampant corruption at Unisa undermines the quality of education, and highlighted the risk that the institution is becoming a "qualifications factory". The claim that Unisa was becoming a diploma mill due to mismanagement were being reviewed by Blade Nzimande, the Minister of Higher Education, Science and Technology. On 19 October 2021, Unisa released a statement attempting to "correct" these claims.

See also 
 List of universities in South Africa
 List of split up universities

References

Notes

External links

The University 
 
 Official Unisa Facebook page
 Official Unisa Twitter page
 Official Unisa YouTube page

International cooperation 
 Institutional Cooperation and Membership
 African Relations
 The Network for Education and Research in Europe (Network of evangelical seminaries, most in Germany)
 Aufbaustudium (MTh UNISA)

 
Schools in Pretoria
Universities in Gauteng
Distance education institutions based in South Africa
Public universities in South Africa
Educational institutions established in 1873
History of Pretoria
1873 establishments in the Cape Colony